"Here I Am" is a song by British rock band Asking Alexandria. It was released on 18 March 2016 as the fifth and final single from their album The Black.

Song meaning
In a track-by-track commentary video released by the band, lead guitarist and primary songwriter Ben Bruce stated about the song:
"We're not shying behind anything, like, 'Here I am, this is me, I'm fucking screaming at the top of my lungs, I'm not trying to hide behind a false ideology: this is who I am, this is what I've been through,' and it kind of encompasses this whole record. It's a very honest, open record, and it's like you can see what we've been through releasing this record, and that's what this song's about, and it's kinda like 'I'm here, my hands are up, I'm not hiding anything, I'm not fucking wearing any clothes, I'm fucking fully naked, this is me.' There's no twists, there's no nothing. What you see is what you get, and what we're telling you is the truth, as naked and as raw, and as natural, and as everything as it gets.""

Music video
The video for the single directed by Steven Contreras was released in May 2016.  It features the band performing in a field, and images of a girl and a hooded figure with a mask.

Charts

References 

2016 singles
2016 songs
Asking Alexandria songs
Songs written by Ben Bruce
Sumerian Records singles